Jennifer Anne Gregory  (born 1946) is an Australian academic and historian. Her research and writing focuses on the history of Western Australia.  she is professor emerita at the University of Western Australia.

Gregory was born Jennifer Anne Gleeson in Melbourne, Victoria in 1946. Her father had been a World War II fighter pilot in the Royal Australian Air Force. He met her mother, a nursing sister, when recuperating from a crash landing. The family moved to Sydney in 1952, where she attended Ascham School. On finishing school she began studies at the National Art School but, following the family's move to Perth in 1965, she enrolled in Perth Technical College. In 1966 she joined the public service and was encouraged to enrol in a tertiary degree. Marriage to Ross Gregory in 1969 and the birth of two children delayed the completion of her bachelor's degree. She graduated from the University of Western Australia (UWA) in  1982 as Bachelor of Arts and with a Ph.D (Manufacture of Middle Class Suburbia) in 1989. From 2009 to 2015 she was head of school (humanities) at UWA.

Awards and recognition 
In 2001 Gregory was awarded a Centenary Medal for "service to the community as President of the National Trust of Western Australia", while in the 2010 Australia Day Honours she was appointed Member of the Order of Australia for "service to the community as a historian and academic and through the promotion and preservation of local and regional history in Western Australia".

Works 

 Western Australia between the wars, 1919–1939, University of Western Australia Press, 1990, 
 Building a Tradition: A history of Scotch College, Perth 1897–1996, University of Western Australia Press, 1996 
 Claremont: A history, co-written by Geoffrey Bolton, University of Western Australia Press, 1999 
 City of Light: A History of Perth Since the Fifties, City of Perth, 2003, 
 Historical Encyclopedia of Western Australia, co-edited by Jan Gothard, UWA Publishing, 2009

References 

1946 births
Living people
University of Western Australia alumni
Academic staff of the University of Western Australia
Australian women historians
Members of the Order of Australia
Recipients of the Centenary Medal
People educated at Ascham School